PJ Masks (French: Pyjamasques) is a computer-animated superhero children's television series based on the Les Pyjamasques book series by Romuald Racioppo. Produced by Frog Box, Entertainment One UK Limited, Walt Disney EMEA Productions Limited and TeamTO, its production has the participation of France Télévisions and Disney Junior. The series is broadcast worldwide on Disney Branded Television's Disney Junior channels; in its home country of France, it airs on France 5. It also airs on Tiny Pop in the UK, ABC Kids in Australia, RAI YoYo in Italy, TV Cultura in Brazil and Televisa in Mexico. It became the world's most watched children's series, and also one of the most-watched Disney Junior shows.

In the United States, the series has been broadcast on Disney Junior since September 18, 2015; in France, it has been broadcast on France 5 and Disney Junior since December 18, 2015. It also premiered on Disney Junior in Canada on 7 February 2016. In June 2016, a second season was announced; it began airing on 15 January 2018. On 19 April 2019, it aired the first episode of the third season. The fourth season was announced to air in April 2020, but instead it aired on 15 May 2020, possibly due to the COVID-19 pandemic (reducing Entertainment One's produced/acquired television half-hour content from 339 for 2019 to 276 for 2020 starting in the second quarter). On 28 January 2020, it was renewed for a fifth season which premiered on August 13, 2021, with production taking place between 1 April 2020 to 1 April 2021. On 18 June 2021, it was renewed for a sixth season forecast to be aired in 2023, with production starting that same day.

On 30 December 2019, Hasbro acquired Entertainment One for a $3.8 billion deal, making it the first Disney Junior program under the ownership of Hasbro, despite having Just Play still make toys for the series.

Premise
Amaya, Greg, and Connor become the superhero team PJ Masks when night falls in order to fight enemies and rivals such as Romeo, Luna Girl, Night Ninja, The Wolfy Kids, Motsuki, Octobella, Pharaoh Boy, Munki-gu, Orticia (former), Pirate Robot (former) and The Speedy Twins to keep them from ruining people's days. Amaya becomes Owlette (an owl), Greg becomes Gekko (a lizard), and Connor becomes Catboy (a combination between cat and boy).

Characters

PJ Masks
PJ Masks (known as "PJs" for short) is the titular superhero team that fights crime at night to keep it from ruining people's days.
 Connor / Catboy (voiced by Jacob Ewaniuk in Season 1, Jacob Ursomarzo in Season 2–"Best Friends Forever", Roman Lutterotti in "Meet An Yu"–Season 4, and Evan O'Donnell in Season 5–present) – Connor is a blue-eyed boy with brown hair. When he transforms, he wears a blue cat costume. His powers include super speed, super-sensitive hearing, high jump, and strikes.
 Amaya / Owlette (voiced by Addison Holley) – Amaya is a brown-eyed bespectacled girl. She has dark brown hair with a pink, wing-shaped hair clip. When she transforms she wears a red owl costume. Her powers include nighttime vision, the ability to fly, the ability to make a strong gust of wind from her wings, and super feathers.
 Greg / Gekko (voiced by Kyle Harrison Breitkopf in Season 1–Season 3 and the shorts and Benjamin Hum in "HQ Tour" and Season 4–present) – Greg is a green-eyed, blonde-haired boy. When he transforms, he wears a green lizard costume with a thick reptilian tail and fins on top of his head. His powers are super strength, invisibility (though some may see him by noticing irregularities in the background), sticking on walls for scaling, and shields.
 PJ Robot (voiced by Juan Luis Bonilla) – A robot who is in charge of the PJ Masks' HQ. Originally created by Romeo to spy on the heroes, but defected and switched sides.
 PJ Pets
 Alley Cat (actor unknown)
 Owly (actor unknown)
 Lionel (actor unknown)
 PJ Riders
 Cat Stripe King (actor unknown)
 Eagle Owl (actor unknown)
 Power Lizard (actor unknown)

Allies
 Teeny Weeny Ninjalino (voiced by Rob Tinkler) – A tiny and cute ninja from "Catboy and the Teeny Weeny Ninjalino", who was supposed to spy on the PJ Masks but won Owlette and Gekko's affection.
 Dylan / Armadylan (voiced by Max Calinescu in Season 2–"Armadylan Zen", Cristian Perri in Season 3 "Arma-Leader"–"Gekko Everywhere", Avery Esteves in Season 4 "Master Fang's Secret"–"Gekko Vs Armavillain", Christian Campbell in Season 4 "Octobella's Garden"–"The Labours of Armadylan", and TBA in Season 6-present) – A strong armadillo-like boy who wants to be a hero, but his inexperience causes him to mess up, especially when he can't control his anger when some villains trick him. His abilities include super-strength, producing earthquakes, and converting to a ball to roll on surfaces or travel underground. He is absent in Season 5, but will return in Season 6.
 An Yu (voiced by Kari Wong) – A samurai girl who uses her bo staff as a weapon or to fly; it also turns into a magic flute and all of it is the source of her powers. She lives in an Oriental-themed forest which can only be entered through portals, anytime she leaves the forest her powers will be gone however she is not completely defenseless without her powers as she can also be a martial acrobatic. She has also been trapped inside the Dragon Gong for 1,000 years and turned into an actual dragon and the cause of all of it is currently unknown.
 Santa Claus (voiced by Ron Pardo) – Santa is the jolly man who appeared in "The PJ Masks Save Christmas." where he teamed up with the PJ Masks.
 Newton / Newton Star (voiced by Shomoy James Mitchell) - A space boy who emerges from a freak asteroid accident. The PJ Masks first met him in space. He also appears in the daytime as a bespectacled boy and hang's out in the Museum's Library. His powers include shields, surfing with asteroids, creating white orbs, and the ability to fly and breathe in space without any special gear.
 Orticia (voiced by Markeda McKay) - A humanoid plant girl who can control and grow plants. She was created by Romeo whose original plan was to make her his henchman. But she defected and decided to go her own way. She turned three ordinary pumpkins from Greg into anthropomorphic buddies. As of Pondweed Party, Orticia learned the true meaning of friendship and reformed and became friends with the PJ Masks.
 Pirate Robot (voiced by Wyatt White) - An accidentally programmed robot by Romeo to find fabulous treasures like a real pirate. He refers to Owlette as his pirate queen. As of Owlette, the Pirate Queen, he shifted from villain to hero.

Villains
 Romeo (voiced by Alex Thorne in Season 1, Carter Thorne in the shorts and Season 2–"Owlette Slips Up", Simon Pirso in "Motsuki the Best"–Season 4, and Callum Shoniker in Season 5–present) – A mad scientist who plans on world domination with all the inventions he creates, and the main antagonist in the series.
 Robot (voiced by Ron Pardo) - A robot that is Romeo's henchman.
 Robette (voiced by Kirrilee Berger) - A female counterpart of Robot.
 Toolbox – A walking toolbox who works with Romeo, and in case of making inventions Toolbox carries Romeo's tools.
 Spy-Bot – A cubical bot that works for Romeo, who often used Spy-Bot to spy on the PJ Masks.
 Fly Bots – Small, flying robots which resemble PJ Robot before he reformed and regularly guard Romeo's Sky Factory.
 Naughty Bots - Naughty Bots are robots disguised as presents, but they destroy everything related to Christmas like presents and Christmas decorations
 Robo-PJ Masks - As the robotic versions of the PJ Masks, they all have the same powers but with the addition of Laser Eyes which stops the enemies from moving.
 Luna Girl (voiced by Brianna D'Aguanno) – A moon-themed villain with platinum blond hair who lives in a palace on the moon. In "Best Friends Forever", it is revealed that her Luna Magnet powers give her the power to breathe in space. Her main weapons are her Luna Magnet and Luna Board which she uses as a mode of transportation.
 Motsuki (voiced by Hattie Kragten) - An anthropomorphic moth whom Luna Girl regards as a little sister. Originally unnamed and one of Luna Girl's army of small moths, Motsuki was granted a special position among her fellow minions as well as a name by her big sister. She was later cocooned in crystal where she evolved into her current form as well as developed the ability of speech.
 The Moths (voice actors unknown in Season 1–2 and Hattie Kragten in Season 3–present) - The minions of Luna Girl.
 Night Ninja (voiced by Trek Buccino in Season 1, Devan Cohen in the shorts and Season 2–"Do the Gekko" and Jacob Soley in "Armadylan, Action Hero"–present) – A ninja who leads a pack of Ninjalinos and is the third main villain of the series. He uses partially dried latex balls called Sticky Splats to trap his opponents, and smoke bombs to teleport from one place to another. He is also acrobatic and can perform telekinesis.
 Ninjalinos (voiced by Rob Tinkler) - The foot soldiers of Night Ninjas.
 The Wolfy Kids - Usually referred to as "the Wolfies", Rip (voiced by Shechinah Mpumlwana), Howler (voiced by Kaden Stephen in Season 2–"Wolfies of the Pagoda" and Matthew Mucci in "Munki-gu in the City"–present), and Kevin (voiced by Ethan Pugiotto) are a trio of werewolf siblings who like to cause mischief. Their only power is shouting out red energy rings which would blow away things in a gale-like fashion.
 Octobella (voiced by Michela Luci) – An octopus-girl who lives in her lair in the moat. Upon meeting the PJ Masks at first, she appears interested in becoming friends with them. But when she learned that Gekko obtained a crystal from her abode and develop some powers, she sees them as thieves and becomes their enemy. Her abilities include throwing underwater tornadoes, invisibility, making various spells using crystals, hypnotizing people to play using glowing orbs, and sonic screams, and giving others the ability to breathe underwater.
 Percival (voiced by Rob Tinkler) - A mumbling lobster who is Octobella's henchman.
 Munki-gu (voiced by Daniel Pathan) – A mischievous little monkey who loves to cause trouble, play, and prank on others. He was once zapped into a stone statue for 1,000 years by the sorcerer as a punishment for being too naughty, however, he was freed by Gekko after he patted on his head 3 times by accident. His powers include imitating other people's voices, flying with his magical boots, and pulling an infinite amount of bananas out of nowhere.
 Pharaoh Boy (voiced by Logan Nicholson) - A mystical young pharaoh who came through a portal discovered in the museum. When he first met the PJ Masks, he started to be bossy towards them and take control of their powers and do what he wants them to do using his Staff of Ra. His Staff of Ra is the source of his powers just like An Yu's bo staff. Unlike An Yu, he has his powers work everywhere and never loses them. Just like Romeo, he also plans on world domination.
 The Speedy Twins - Carly (voiced by Emma Ho) and Cartoka (voiced by Ian Ho) are a duo of twin speedy siblings and are the arch-enemies of Catboy. They have a Flashcar combined with PJ Mask's original three vehicles that they stole in Carly and Cartoka. And they had them until PJ Riders helped them retrieve them.

Episodes

Production
PJ Masks is a British/French co-production by Entertainment One, Frog Box, and TeamTO. The series was renewed for a second season consisting of 52 11-minute segments in June 2016; it premiered on 15 January 2018. The series was renewed for a third season on 22 January 2018; originally meant to premiere in June 2019, it instead premiered on 19 April that same year. The series was renewed for a fourth season on June 5, 2019; originally meant to premiere sometime in April 2020, it instead premiered on 15 May 2020 (possibly due to COVID-19 pandemic). The series was renewed for a fifth season on January 28, 2020, it premiered on August 13, 2021. The sixth season is in production as of 18 June 2021 and will be released sometime in 2023.

Streaming services
Seasons of PJ Masks are currently available worldwide on the Disney+ and Netflix streaming services.

References

External links

 
 
  on Disney Junior

 
2010s British animated television series
2010s French animated television series
2020s British animated television series
2020s French animated television series
2015 British television series debuts
2015 French television series debuts
British children's animated superhero television series
French children's animated superhero television series
British computer-animated television series
French computer-animated television series
English-language television shows
Disney Junior original programming
Television series by Entertainment One
France Télévisions children's television series
Animated television series about children